Carlos Menem was president of Argentina from 1989 to 1999.

Economic policy

When Menem began his presidency, there was a huge hyperinflation and recession. The first measure was a mandatory conversion of time deposits into government bonds. It generated more recession, but hyperinflation was lowered. Despite being a Peronist, Menem privatized several state-owned companies, such as telephones and airlines. One of the leading privatizations was YPF, engaged in the exploration and production of oil and gas.

His fourth economy minister, Domingo Cavallo, deepened the neoliberal reforms. He proposed a Convertibility Plan that set a one-to-one fixed exchange rate between the Argentine peso and the US dollar. The law also limited public expenditures, but this was frequently ignored.

A dramatic influx of foreign direct investment funds helped tame inflation (from 5,000% a year in 1989 to single digits by 1993) and improved long-stagnant productivity, though at the cost of considerable unemployment.

Menem's successful turnaround of the economy made the country one of the top performers in the world of the developing countries.  Argentina's GDP (below 1973 levels when Menem took office) increased 35% from 1990 to 1994 and fixed investment, by 150%. Negotiations with Brazil resulted in the Mercosur customs union in March 1991. On November 14 that year, Menem addressed a joint session of the U.S. Congress, one of only three Argentine presidents to do so (others were Raúl Alfonsín and Arturo Frondizi).

With these successes, Menem was reelected to the presidency by a large majority in the 1995 elections. The early success of the dollar peg (when the dollar was falling) was followed by increasing economic difficulties when the dollar began to rise from 1995 onwards in international markets. High external debt also caused increasing problems. Financial crises affecting other countries (the Tequila Crisis in Mexico, the East Asian financial crisis, the Russian financial crisis in 1998) led to higher interest rates for Argentina as well. By the end of Menem's term, Argentina's country risk premium was a low 6.10 percentage points above yield on comparable US Treasuries.

Domestic policy

Menem began his presidency assuming a nonconfrontational approach, and appointing people from the conservative opposition and business people in his cabinet.

Menem's presidency was initially bolstered by the significant economic recovery following Cavallo's appointment as Economy Minister. His Justicialist Party enjoyed victories in mid-term elections in 1991 and 1993, as well as in his 1995 campaign for reelection.

In domestic policy, his administration created programs to improve AIDS awareness, increased flood prevention, vaccination, and improved child nutrition. In addition, his government launched a Social Plan to increase spending on antipoverty programs, while other social programs addressed needs for poor Argentines. These policies arguably had a positive impact on poverty reduction, with the percentage of Argentines estimated to be living in poverty falling during Menem's first term as president. The Argentine quota law, proposed by the UCR, increased the number of women in the Argentine Congress.

In 1994, after a political agreement (the Olivos Pact) with the Radical Civic Union party leader, former president Raúl Alfonsín, Menem succeeded in having the Constitution modified to allow presidential re-election. He ran for office once again in 1995.

The new Constitution also introduced decisive checks and balances to presidential power. It made the Mayor of Buenos Aires an elective position (previously the office was designated for political appointees, who controlled a huge budget in the capital). The opposition candidate was elected as mayor in 1996. The president of the Central Bank and the Director of the AFIP (Federal Tax & Customs Central Agency), while political appointees, could be removed only with the approval of Congress. The new constitution created an ombudsman position, and a board to review and propose new judicial candidates.

The majority of the population criticized Menem's neoliberal policies, as did some in the Catholic Church. Opponents among unemployed workers developed the Piquetero movement. Some economists said his financial policies were anti-liberal. These mounting problems and a rise in crime rates contributed to defeat for his party during the 1997 mid-term elections, the first time his administration faltered.

Armed forces
On 3 December 1990, Menem had ordered the forceful repression of a politically motivated uprising by a far-right figure, Col. Mohamed Alí Seineldín, ending the military's involvement in the country's political life.

Menem was strongly criticized for his pardon on 29 December 1990, of Jorge Videla, Emilio Massera, Leopoldo Galtieri and other men who had been leaders of the 1976–83 dictatorship responsible for government terrorism and the disappearance of an estimated 15,000 political prisoners. They were convicted in the 1985 Trial of the Juntas. He also pardoned some guerrilla leaders on the grounds of national reconciliation. Nearly 50,000 people gathered in protest in Buenos Aires. Former President Raúl Alfonsín called it "the saddest day in Argentine history."

The president effected drastic cuts to the military budget, and appointed Lt. Gen. Martín Balza as the Army's General Chief of Staff (head of the military hierarchy). Balza, a man of strong democratic convictions and a vocal critic of the Falklands War, had stood up for the legitimate government in every attempted coup d'état throughout his senior career. He gave the first institutional self-criticism about the Armed Forces' involvement in the 1976 coup and the ensuing reign of terror. Following the brutal death of a conscript, Menem abolished conscription in 1994, decisively ending a military prerogative over society.

Death of his son
Carlos Menem Jr., son of the president, died in a helicopter accident on 15 March 1995. He was 26 years old. His death remains a mystery, but his father and mother, Zulema Yoma de Menem, suspect he was murdered. Roberto Locles, a ballistics expert, believes that "Carlitos" died in an attempted assassination.

Foreign policy
Menem's government re-established relations with the United Kingdom, suspended since the Falklands War, within months of taking office. He also earned plaudits for resolving territorial disputes with neighboring Chile. His administration peacefully solved more than 20 border issues with Chile, including the arbitration of the especially serious Laguna del Desierto dispute.

Menem's tenure suffered most from local economic fallout due to the Mexican peso crisis of 1995. It became tainted by repeated accusations by opponents of corruption. Menem administration's handling of the investigations of the 1992 Israeli Embassy bombing and the 1994 bombing of the AMIA Jewish community center in Buenos Aires were criticised as being dishonest and superficial. He is suspected of diverting the investigation from clues suggesting Iranian involvement, to avoid engaging with that power over the attacks as well as covering for a family friend, Alberto Kanoore Edul, a Syrian-Argentine businessman suspected of involvement in the attacks.

Cabinet

References

 
Presidencies of Argentina
1989 establishments in Argentina
1999 disestablishments in Argentina
Articles containing video clips